Gregory James Tristan Hegglun (born 7 August 1984) is a New Zealand cricketer who plays for Central Districts in the State Shield. Hegglun has also played for Marlborough in the Hawke Cup. He was born in Blenheim.

External links 
Greg Hegglun's profile on Cricinfo

1984 births
Living people
New Zealand cricketers
Central Districts cricketers
Cricketers from Blenheim, New Zealand
21st-century New Zealand people